A pentagram (sometimes known as a pentalpha, pentangle, or star pentagon) is a regular five-pointed star polygon, formed from the diagonal line segments of a convex (or simple, or non-self-intersecting) regular pentagon. Drawing a circle around the five points creates a similar symbol referred to as the pentacle, which is used widely by Wiccans and in paganism, or as a sign of life and connections. The word "pentagram" refers only to the five-pointed star, not the surrounding circle of a pentacle.

Pentagrams were used symbolically in ancient Greece and Babylonia. Christians once commonly used the pentagram to represent the five wounds of Jesus.  Today the symbol is widely used by the Wiccans, witches, and pagans. The pentagram has magical associations. Many people who practice neopaganism wear jewelry incorporating the symbol.

The word pentagram comes from the Greek word πεντάγραμμον (pentagrammon), from πέντε (pente), "five" + γραμμή (grammē), "line".
Pentagram refers to just the star and pentacle refers to the star within the circle specifically although there is some overlap in usage. The word pentalpha is a 17th-century revival of a post-classical Greek name of the shape.

History

Early history
Early pentagrams have been found on Sumerian pottery from Ur circa 3500 BCE, and the five-pointed star was at various times the symbol of Ishtar or Marduk.

Pentagram symbols from about 5,000 years ago were found in the Liangzhu culture of China.

The pentagram was known to the ancient Greeks, with a depiction on a vase possibly dating back to the 7th century BCE. Pythagoreanism originated in the 6th century BCE and used the pentagram as a symbol of mutual recognition, of wellbeing, and to recognize good deeds and charity.

From around 300-150 BCE the pentagram stood as the symbol of Jerusalem, marked by the 5 Hebrew letters ירשלם spelling its name.

The word Pentemychos ( lit. "five corners" or "five recesses") was the title of the cosmogony of  Pherecydes of Syros.
Here, the "five corners" are where the seeds of Chronos are placed within the Earth in order for the cosmos to appear.

In Neoplatonism, the pentagram was said to have been used as a symbol or sign of recognition by the  Pythagoreans, who called the pentagram   "health"

Western symbolism

Middle Ages
The pentagram was used in ancient times as a Christian symbol for the five senses, or of the five wounds of Christ. The pentagram plays an important symbolic role in the 14th-century English poem Sir Gawain and the Green Knight, in which the symbol decorates the shield of the hero, Gawain. The unnamed poet credits the symbol's origin to King Solomon, and explains that each of the five interconnected points represents a virtue tied to a group of five: Gawain is perfect in his five senses and five fingers, faithful to the Five Wounds of Christ, takes courage from the five joys that Mary had of Jesus, and exemplifies the five virtues of knighthood, which are generosity, friendship, chastity, chivalry, and piety.

The North rose of Amiens Cathedral (built in the 13th century) exhibits a pentagram-based motif. Some sources interpret the unusual downward-pointing star as symbolizing the Holy Spirit descending on people.

Renaissance
Heinrich Cornelius Agrippa and others perpetuated the popularity of the pentagram as a magic symbol, attributing the five neoplatonic elements to the five points, in typical Renaissance fashion.

Romanticism
By the mid-19th century, a further distinction had developed amongst occultists regarding the pentagram's orientation. With a single point upwards it depicted spirit presiding over the four elements of matter, and was essentially "good". However, the influential but controversial writer Éliphas Lévi, known for believing that magic was a real science, had called it evil whenever the symbol appeared the other way up.
"A reversed pentagram, with two points projecting upwards, is a symbol of evil and attracts sinister forces because it overturns the proper order of things and demonstrates the triumph of matter over spirit. It is the goat of lust attacking the heavens with its horns, a sign execrated by initiates."
"The flaming star, which, when turned upside down, is the  sign of the goat of black magic, whose head may be drawn in the star, the two horns at the top, the ears to the right and left, the beard at the bottom. It is a sign of antagonism and fatality. It is the goat of lust attacking the heavens with its horns."
"Let us keep the figure of the Five-pointed Star always upright, with the topmost triangle pointing to heaven, for it is the seat of wisdom, and if the figure is reversed, perversion and evil will be the result."

The apotropaic use of the pentagram symbol in German folklore (called Drudenfuss in German) is referred to by Goethe in Faust (1808), where a pentagram prevents Mephistopheles from leaving a room (but did not prevent him from entering by the same way, as the outward pointing corner of the diagram happened to be imperfectly drawn):

East Asian symbolism

Wu Xing are the five phases, or five elements in Taoists Chinese tradition. They are differentiated  from the formative ancient Japanese or Greek elements, due to their emphasis on cyclic transformations and change. The five phases are: Fire (火 huǒ), Earth (土 tǔ), Metal (金 jīn), Water (水 shuǐ), and Wood (木 mù). The Wuxing is the fundamental philosophy and doctrine of traditional Chinese Medicine and Acupuncture.

Uses in modern occultism
Based on Renaissance-era occultism, the pentagram found its way into the symbolism of modern occultists. Its major use is a continuation of the ancient Babylonian use of the pentagram as an apotropaic charm to protect against evil forces. Éliphas Lévi claimed that "The Pentagram expresses the mind's domination over the elements and it is by this sign that we bind the demons of the air, the spirits of fire, the spectres of water, and the ghosts of earth." In this spirit, the Hermetic Order of the Golden Dawn developed the use of the pentagram in the lesser banishing ritual of the pentagram, which is still used to this day by those who practice Golden Dawn-type magic.

Aleister Crowley made use of the pentagram in his Thelemic system of magick: an adverse or inverted pentagram represents the descent of spirit into matter, according to the interpretation of Lon Milo DuQuette. Crowley contradicted his old comrades in the Hermetic Order of the Golden Dawn, who, following Levi, considered this orientation of the symbol evil and associated it with the triumph of matter over spirit.

Use in new religious movements

Baháʼí Faith

The five-pointed star is a symbol of the Baháʼí Faith. In the Baháʼí Faith, the star is known as the Haykal, and it was initiated and established by the Báb. The Báb and Bahá'u'lláh wrote various works in the form of a pentagram.

The Church of Jesus Christ of Latter-day Saints
The Church of Jesus Christ of Latter-day Saints is theorized to have begun using both upright and inverted five-pointed stars in Temple architecture, dating from the Nauvoo Illinois Temple dedicated on 30 April 1846. Other temples decorated with five-pointed stars in both orientations include the Salt Lake Temple and the Logan Utah Temple. These usages come from the symbolism found in Revelation chapter 12: "And there appeared a great wonder in heaven; a woman clothed with the sun, and the moon under her feet, and upon her head a crown of twelve stars."

Wicca

Because of a perceived association with Satanism and occultism, many United States schools in the late 1990s sought to prevent students from displaying the pentagram on clothing or jewelry. In public schools, such actions by administrators were determined in 2000 to be in violation of students' First Amendment right to free exercise of religion.

The encircled pentagram (referred to as a pentacle by the plaintiffs) was added to the list of 38 approved religious symbols to be placed on the tombstones of fallen service members at Arlington National Cemetery on 24 April 2007. The decision was made following ten applications from families of fallen soldiers who practiced Wicca. The government paid the families  to settle their pending lawsuits.

Other religious use

Satanism 

The inverted pentagram is the symbol used for Satanism, sometimes depicted with the goat's head of Baphomet within it, which originated from the Church of Satan. In some depictions the devil is depicted, like Baphomet, as a goat, therefore the goat and goat's head is a significant symbol throughout Satanism. The pentagram is also used as the logo for The Satanic Temple, which also featured a depiction of Baphomet's head. The Sigil of Baphomet is also adopted by the Joy of Satan Ministries who instead incorporate cuneiform script, attributing it to the earliest use of the pentagram in Sumeria.

Serer religion

The five-pointed star is a symbol of the Serer religion and the Serer people of West Africa. Called Yoonir in their language, it symbolizes the universe in the Serer creation myth, and also represents the star Sirius.

Judaism 
The pentagram has been used in Judaism since at least 300BCE when it first was used as the stamp of Jerusalem. It is used to represent justice, mercy, and wisdom.

Other modern use
The pentagram is featured on the national flags of Morocco (adopted 1915) and Ethiopia (adopted 1996 and readopted 2009)

The Order of the Eastern Star, an organization (established 1850) associated with Freemasonry, uses a pentagram as its symbol, with the five isosceles triangles of the points colored blue, yellow, white, green, and red.  In most Grand Chapters the pentagram is used pointing down, but in a few, it is pointing up. Grand Chapter officers often have a pentagon inscribed around the star(the emblem shown here is from the Prince Hall Association).

A pentagram is featured on the flag of the Dutch city of Haaksbergen, as well on its coat of arms.

A pentagram is featured on the flag of the Japanese city of Nagasaki, as well on its emblem.

Geometry

The pentagram is the simplest regular star polygon. The pentagram contains ten points (the five points of the star, and the five vertices of the inner pentagon) and fifteen line segments. It is represented by the Schläfli symbol {5/2}. Like a regular pentagon, and a regular pentagon with a pentagram constructed inside it, the regular pentagram has as its symmetry group the dihedral group of order 10.

It can be seen as a net of a pentagonal pyramid although with isosceles triangles.

Construction
The pentagram can be constructed by connecting alternate vertices of a pentagon; see details of the construction. It can also be constructed as a stellation of a pentagon, by extending the edges of a pentagon until the lines intersect.

Truncation
A uniform truncated pentagram t{5/2} produces a doubly-wrapped pentagon with overlapping vertices and edges, {10/2}. A shallower truncation produces an isogonal figure, like this one with equally spaced vertices. A truncated retro-pentagram t{5/3}, or a quasitruncation, produces a decagram, {10/3}.

Golden ratio

The golden ratio, φ = (1 + ) / 2 ≈ 1.618, satisfying

plays an important role in regular pentagons and pentagrams. Each intersection of edges sections the edges in the golden ratio: the ratio of the length of the edge to the longer segment is φ, as is the length of the longer segment to the shorter. Also, the ratio of the length of the shorter segment to the segment bounded by the two intersecting edges (a side of the pentagon in the pentagram's center) is φ. As the four-color illustration shows:

The pentagram includes ten isosceles triangles: five acute and five obtuse isosceles triangles. In all of them, the ratio of the longer side to the shorter side is φ. The acute triangles are golden triangles. The obtuse isosceles triangle highlighted via the colored lines in the illustration is a golden gnomon.

Trigonometric values

As a result, in an isosceles triangle with one or two angles of 36°, the longer of the two side lengths is φ times that of the shorter of the two, both in the case of the acute as in the case of the obtuse triangle.

Spherical pentagram

A pentagram can be drawn as a star polygon on a sphere, composed of five great circle arcs, whose all internal angles are right angles. This shape was described by John Napier in his 1614 book Mirifici logarithmorum canonis descriptio (Description of the wonderful rule of logarithms) along with rules that link the values of trigonometric functions of five parts of a right spherical triangle (two angles and three sides). It was studied later by Carl Friedrich Gauss.

Three-dimensional figures

Several polyhedra incorporate pentagrams:

Higher dimensions
Orthogonal projections of higher dimensional polytopes can also create pentagrammic figures:

All ten 4-dimensional Schläfli–Hess 4-polytopes have either pentagrammic faces or vertex figure elements.

Pentagram of Venus

The pentagram of Venus is the apparent path of the planet Venus as observed from Earth. Successive inferior conjunctions of Venus repeat with an orbital resonance of approximately 13:8—that is, Venus orbits the Sun approximately 13 times for every eight orbits of Earth—shifting 144° at each inferior conjunction. The tips of the five loops at the center of the figure have the same geometric relationship to one another as the five vertices, or points, of a pentagram, and each group of five intersections equidistant from the figure's center have the same geometric relationship.

In computer systems

The pentagram has these Unicode code points that enable them to be included in documents:

See also

 
 
 
 
 
 
 
 
 
 Pentachoron – the 4-simplex

References

Bibliography

External links

The Pythagorean Pentacle from the Biblioteca Arcana.

Christian symbols
Golden ratio
Magic symbols
National symbols of Ethiopia
National symbols of Morocco
5 (number)
Pythagorean symbols
Religious symbols
05
Serer religious symbols
Wicca